The 2022 Music Victoria Awards are the 17th Annual Music Victoria Awards. The ceremony is scheduled to take place in December 2022.
 
The list of industry-voted nominees was announced on 27 October 2022 and the public voted nominees announced on 10 November 2022.

Music Victoria CEO Simone Schinkel said of the awards "Last night's Music Victoria Awards ceremony was bursting at the seams with the community, camaraderie, and solidarity that we have seen from the music community throughout the Music Victoria Awards campaign. It was an honour to witness three generations in attendance, alongside the full spectrum of the industry involved in contemporary music."

Hall of Fame inductees
 Deborah Conway (AM)
 Helen Marcou (AM) and Ian McLean (AM) - founders of Bakehouse Studios
 Best Musician - Xani Kolac

Award nominees and winners
Winners indicated in boldface, with other nominees in plain.

Public Voted Awards

Industry Voted Awards

References

External links
 
 

 
2022 in Australian music
2022 music awards
Music Victoria Awards